Tamba ware, also spelled Tanba, and also known as Tamba-Tachikui ware (丹波立杭焼, Tamba-Tachikui-yaki) is a type of Japanese pottery produced in Sasayama and Tachikui in Hyōgo Prefecture.

History 
It is considered one of the Six Ancient Kilns of Japan.

External links 

Japanese pottery
Culture in Hyōgo Prefecture